Stephen Victor Chmilar (born 24 May 1945 in Lamont, Alberta, Canada) is a Canadian Ukrainian Greek Catholic hierarch. He served as Eparchial Bishop of Ukrainian Catholic Eparchy of Toronto from 3 May 2003 until his retirement on 9 November 2019.

Life
Bishop Chmilar was born in the family of ethnical Ukrainian Greek-Catholics in Canada. After the school education, he subsequently joined the Order of Saint Basil the Great, where he had a solemn profession on November 17, 1968. Chmilar was ordained as a priest on June 11, 1972, after studies at the University of Ottawa (1966–1968) with bachelor's degree in philosophy and Saint Paul University in Ottawa (1968–1972) with bachelor's degree in theology.

After that he had a various pastoral assignments and served as a parish priest, spiritual director and director of the Christian summer camps at the Basilian and another ecclesiastical Institutes in Canada. In 1991 he left the Basilian Order and was incardinated in the Ukrainian Eparchy of Toronto.

On May 3, 2003, Fr. Chmilar was nominated by Pope John Paul II and on July 23, 2003 consecrated to the Episcopate as the third Eparchial Bishop of the Ukrainian Catholic Eparchy of Toronto. The principal consecrator was Cardinal Lubomyr Husar, the Head of the Ukrainian Greek-Catholic Church.

Retired on 9 November 2019, before turning an age limit of 75 years old.

References

External links

1945 births
Living people
People from Lamont, Alberta
University of Ottawa alumni
Saint Paul University alumni
Canadian bishops
Canadian Eastern Catholics
21st-century Eastern Catholic bishops
Bishops of the Ukrainian Greek Catholic Church
Canadian members of the Ukrainian Greek Catholic Church
Order of Saint Basil the Great
Canadian people of Ukrainian descent